Chalampalli is a village in the Gram panchayat of Ganugachintha, Rompicherla Mandal, Chittoor district in the state of Andhra Pradesh, India. It is located 8 km from Rompicherla and 20 km from Pileru.

Demographics

Chalampalli is home to approximately 500 people, mainly from the Velama, Naidu and Reddy castes, but with a number of others represented, including Golla, Vaddi, Chakali and Harijana.

References

Villages in Chittoor district